Humiria is a genus of flowering plants in the family Humiriaceae found in lowland forests of South America. 

Species include: 

 Humiria balsamifera Aubl.
 Humiria crassifolia Mart.
 Humiria fruticosa Cuatrec.
 Humiria wurdackii Cuatrec.

References

Humiriaceae
Malpighiales genera